The 1990–91 season was Parma Associazione Calcio's 78th in Italian football and their first ever season in the Serie A. It was Nevio Scala's second year at the club, as Parma achieved promotion the previous season, by finishing in fourth place. In their first season, they finished in sixth place, before securing a UEFA Cup spot. In the Coppa Italia, they were eliminated 2–0 on aggregate by Fiorentina in the second round, after two legs. Alberto Di Chiara, who went on to join the club the same season, and Stefano Borgonovo, scored the goals.

Squad

Goalkeepers
Cláudio Taffarel
Marco Ferrari

Defenders
Enzo Gambaro
Luigi Apolloni
Lorenzo Minotti
Georges Grün
Cornelio Donati
Stefano Rossini
Giovanni Bia
Gianpaolo Morabito
Antonio Sconziano
Sebastiano Siviglia

Midfielders
|Daniele Zoratto
Stefano Cuoghi
Aldo Monza
Tarcisio Catanese
Tomas Brolin
Marco Osio
Rocco De Marco

Forwards
Alessandro Melli
Giovanni Sorce
Graziano Mannari
Mario Lemme

Competitions

Serie A

League table

Matches

Goalscorers
  Alessandro Melli 13
  Tomas Brolin 7
  Marco Osio 6
  Lorenzo Minotti 4
  Georges Grün 2
  Giovanni Sorce 1

Coppa Italia

Second round

References

Parma Calcio 1913 seasons
Parma